The 2005 America East men's basketball tournament was held from March 4–6 at the Binghamton University Events Center. The final was held on March 12, at Patrick Gym on the campus of the University of Vermont. Vermont gained its third consecutive berth to the NCAA tournament with its win over Northeastern. Vermont was given the 13th seed in the Austin Regional of the NCAA Tournament and lost in the second round to Michigan State 72–61, after upsetting #4 Syracuse 60–57 in overtime. Both Boston University and Northeastern gained a bid to the NIT and lost in the first round to Georgetown and Memphis respectively.

Bracket and Results

See also
America East Conference

References

America East Conference men's basketball tournament
2004–05 America East Conference men's basketball season
2005 in sports in Vermont
Sports competitions in Burlington, Vermont
College basketball tournaments in Vermont